The British .577 Snider–Enfield was a breech-loading rifle. The American Jacob Snider invented this firearm action, and the Snider–Enfield was one of the most widely used of the Snider varieties. The British Army adopted it in 1866 as a conversion system for its ubiquitous Pattern 1853 Enfield muzzle-loading rifles, and used it until 1874 when the Martini–Henry rifle began to supersede it. The  British Indian Army used the Snider–Enfield until the end of the nineteenth century.

Design and manufacture

In trials, the Snider Pattern 1853 conversions proved both more accurate than the original Pattern 1853s and much faster firing; a trained soldier could fire ten aimed rounds per minute with the breech-loader, compared with only three rounds per minute with the muzzle-loading weapon. From 1866 onwards, the Enfield rifles were converted in large numbers at the Royal Small Arms Factory (RSAF) Enfield beginning with the initial pattern, the Mark I. The converted rifles received a new breechblock/receiver assembly, but retained the original iron barrel, furniture, lock, and hammer.

The Mark III rifles were newly made. They featured steel barrels which were so marked, flat nosed hammers, and a latch-locking breech block instead of the simple integral block lifting tang.

The Snider–Enfield used a new type of metal-cased cartridge called a Boxer cartridge after its designer. The breech block housed a diagonally downward sloping firing pin struck with a front-action lock mounted hammer. To operate the weapon, the rifleman cocked the hammer, flipped the block out of the receiver to the right by grasping the left mounted breech block lever, and then pulled the block back to extract the spent case. There was no ejector, so the firer turned the rifle to the right and upside-down to allow the case to drop out.

Service

The Snider first saw action with the British/Indian Army at the battle of Magdala (Aroghee) in Ethiopia on 10 April 1868, against the forces of Tewodros II of Ethiopia; during the battle the 4th (King's Own) Regiment of Foot alone fired 10,200 rounds. The Snider–Enfield served throughout the British Empire, including Cape Colony, India, Australia, New Zealand, and Canada, until its gradual phaseout by the Martini–Henry, beginning in 1874. Volunteer and militia forces continued to use it until the late 1880s. It stayed in service with the Indian Army until the mid-1890s, because between the Indian Rebellion of 1857 and 1905 the British kept the Indian Army one weapon generation behind British units. The Hunza Scouts may have been the last to use it in action (in the carbine version), in the Chitral campaign of 1895. The Indian units received the Martini–Henry when the British adopted the Lee–Metford. The Ijeshas used large numbers of Snider–Enfields against Ibadan during the 16-year-long Yoruba Civil War (1877 to 1893).

Frank Richards, who served on the Northwest Frontier between 1902 and 1908, records in Old Soldier Sahib that the British army still used Sniders during that period. Sentries on night duty in camps and cantonments would carry a Snider and buckshot cartridges. Should tribesmen try to get into the camp to steal rifles, the buckshot would give the sentries a better chance of hitting the thief, and unlike a .303 round, would be less likely to wound or kill a comrade should the sentry miss.

The Snider was notably powerful. Rudyard Kipling gave a graphic depiction of its effect in his poem, "The Grave of the Hundred Head":

A Snider squibbed in the jungle—
Somebody laughed and fled,
And the men of the First Shikaris
Picked up their Subaltern dead,
With a big blue mark in his forehead
And the back blown out of his head.

Variants

The Snider–Enfield was produced in several variants. The most commonly encountered variants were the Rifled Musket or Long Rifle, the Short Rifle, and the Cavalry and Artillery Carbines. The Long Rifle has a  barrel and three barrel bands. The Short Rifle has a  barrel and two barrel bands with iron furniture. This variant was issued to sergeants of line infantry and rifle units. The Cavalry Carbine is half stocked and has only one barrel band. It has a  barrel, with the same rifling as the Short Rifle. The Artillery Carbine has a  barrel with a full stock and two barrel bands, and the same rifling as the Short Rifle and Cavalry Carbine.

The Snider was the subject of substantial imitation, in both approved and questionable forms, including the Nepalese Snider, which was a nearly exact copy, the Dutch Snider, Danish Naval Snider, and the "unauthorised" adaptations of the French Tabatière and Russian Krnka.

There were also "Trade Pattern" Snider–Enfields, being Snider–Enfields made for private purchase by various English gun-makers. These were often intended for sale to members of volunteer military units, or simply to anyone who might wish to purchase a rifle.

Modern usage 
Enthusiasts still use these rifles today, with the number in circulation boosted by the acquisition by Atlanta Cutlery and International Military Antiques of a vast quantity of antique weapons held in the Royal Nepalese Armory in the Lagan Silekhana Palace for over a century. Ammunition is reloaded into either modern production .577 Snider cases, or re-formed 24-gauge brass shotgun shells. Black powder or modern black-powder substitutes are used. The Halifax Citadel Regimental Association does live-fire demonstrations in the Halifax Citadel; they have around 60 of these rifles. In addition, the Fort Henry Guard at Fort Henry, Kingston also uses the various variants of this weapon for their re-enactments.

See also
 British military rifles
 Springfield Model 1873

References

External links

 Loading and Firing a Snider–Enfield

Early rifles
Police weapons
Rifles of the United Kingdom
Royal Irish Constabulary
North-West Mounted Police
Victorian-era weapons of the United Kingdom
Weapons of Portugal
British Army equipment
Hinged breechblock rifles
Weapons of the Ottoman Empire